Lesbian, gay, bisexual, and transgender (LGBT) persons in Algeria face legal challenges and discrimination not experienced by non-LGBT citizens. According to the International Lesbian and Gay Association's May 2008 report, both male and female same-sex sexual acts are illegal in Algeria.

Law regarding same-sex sexual activity
Article 338 of Algerian law (English translation) reads:

Article 333 of the Algerian law (English translation) reads:

Vigilante executions, beatings, and torture are also allowed with police joining in on the attacks, being complicit, or turning a blind eye.

The criminals laws originate from the prevailing mores in Algeria that view homosexuality and cross-dressing as against the Islamic faith.

Living conditions
Homosexuality is prohibited by law, and the prevailing social attitude is openly negative, even violent. The law does not recognize or respect the civil rights of LGBT persons.  Officially, there are no gay-friendly establishments and no political organization is allowed to campaign for LGBT rights. Examples of hate crimes against homosexuals include the stoning of two men in the street in 2001 and the killing of two men, one in 1994 and the other in 1996.

Most attempts of having unofficial same-sex marriage are blocked by police, as was the case in a 2005 attempt.

Assil Belatla was a student who was murdered for suspicion of being gay in 2019. The student was killed in his dormitory in the university district and the words "he is gay" were painted on the wall with his blood, the murderer thought that he would avoid judicial follow-up for that.

Houari Manar, a popular raï singer widely thought to be gay, died in 2019. Following his death several homophobic comments were made on social media.

According to a survey done for BBC News Arabic by the Arab Barometer research network in 2018-19, about 26% of Algerians think that homosexuality should be accepted.

Summary table

See also

Human rights in Algeria
Politics of Algeria
LGBT rights in Africa

Notes

Human rights in Algeria
Algeria
Algeria
LGBT in Algeria
Politics of Algeria